Kassim Aidara (born 12 May 1987) is a Senegalese-French former professional footballer who played as a midfielder.

Career
Aidara started his career with Wellington United of New Zealand and subsequently represented lower league German clubs namely Niendorfer TSV, USC Paloma, Lüneburger SK Hansa.

In December 2011, Aidara signed for Estonian club JK Tallinna Kalev. After having scored four goals for the club, he switched to JK Sillamäe Kalev of the same country on 31 July 2012. In the 2013 season, he scored 17 goals in 34 matches. He moved to FCI Tallinn in the following year. At the end of the year, he trialled with Vietnamese club Sông Lam Nghệ An. In 2016, he returned to Sillamäe.

Aidara switched clubs and countries on 4 October 2017 and signed for Indian I-League side Minerva Punjab. On 25 November, he made his debut for the club in a 1–1 draw against Mohun Bagan. On 11 December, he scored his first goal for the club in a 2–1 victory against Chennai City. Aidara won the 2017–18 I-League with Minerva Punjab. 

Aidara joined East Bengal FC for the 2018–19 season after the 2017–18 I-League season ended.

Personal life
He is the elder brother of Mohamed Aidara who also is a footballer.

References

External links

1987 births
Living people
Senegalese footballers
Footballers from Hamburg
Association football midfielders
Meistriliiga players
Esiliiga players
I-League players
Calcutta Football League players
Wellington United players
USC Paloma players
Lüneburger SK Hansa players
JK Tallinna Kalev players
FCI Tallinn players
JK Sillamäe Kalev players
RoundGlass Punjab FC players
East Bengal Club players
Senegalese expatriate footballers
Senegalese expatriate sportspeople in New Zealand
Expatriate association footballers in New Zealand
Senegalese expatriate sportspeople in Germany
Expatriate footballers in Germany
Senegalese expatriate sportspeople in Estonia
Expatriate footballers in Estonia
Senegalese expatriate sportspeople in India
Expatriate footballers in India